Lincoln Preparatory School is a charter school in Grambling, Louisiana, USA.

History
Lincoln Preparatory School was previously known as Grambling State University Laboratory High School. It was a public high school operated by Grambling State University in  Grambling, Louisiana, USA.  Alma J. Brown Elementary, Grambling Middle Magnet School and Grambling State University Laboratory High School merged under one charter system.  The changes took effect for the 2016–17 school year and the name was changed to Lincoln Preparatory School. Grambling State University had previously supplemented the schools with higher education funding, but budget cuts to higher education in Louisiana endangered the public school options in Grambling and the schools may have closed.

Athletics
Lincoln Preparatory School athletics competes in the LHSAA.

References

Grambling, Louisiana
Charter schools in Louisiana